The Saab 93 (pronounced ninety-three) is the second production automobile that was manufactured by Saab. Styled by Sixten Sason, it was first presented on December 1, 1955. The 93 was powered by a longitudinally-mounted three-cylinder 748 cc Saab two-stroke engine giving 33 hp (25 kW). The gearbox had three gears, the first unsynchronised. In order to overcome the problems of oil starvation on overrun (engine braking) for the two-stroke engine, a freewheel device was fitted. In 1957, two-point seatbelts were introduced as an option. The 93 was the first Saab to be exported from Sweden, with most exports going to the United States. A Saxomat clutch and a cabrio coach (large cloth sunroof) were available as options.

On September 2, 1957, the 93B was introduced. The original two-piece windshield was also replaced with a one-piece windshield.

In 1957, Erik Carlsson finished 1st in the Finland Rally in a Saab 93; in 1959, he was 1st in the Swedish Rally, also in a Saab 93. However, Saab was not the first Swedish manufacturer to win the Swedish Rally. Saab's long-standing Swedish rival, Volvo, had beaten them consecutively in 1957 and 1958 with the PV544.

In late 1959, the 93F was introduced, featuring front-hinged doors from the Saab GT750. 1960 was the last year of production for the 93. The 93 was replaced by the Saab 96, although the two models were sold side by side for the earlier part of the year. A total of 52,731 Saab 93s were made.

Saab Sonett I shared many of its components with the 93.

Motor sport history

1956 
 Wiesbaden Rallye, Germany (June 24, 1956)
 1st Bengt Jonsson and Kjell Persson
 Rally Viking, Norway
 1st Carl-Magnus Skogh
 2nd Erik Carlsson
 4th Ivar Andersson
 Rikspokalen, Sweden
 1st Erik Carlsson
 Scandiatrofén, Sweden
 1st Erik Carlsson and Carl-Magnus Skogh (shared)
 Tour d'Europe Continental
 2nd Rolf Mellde and Sverker Benson
 Tulpen Rally, The Netherlands
 2nd Sture Nottorp and Charlie Lohmander
 3rd Gunnar Bengtsson and Sven Zetterberg
 7th Bengt Jonsson and Sölve Relve

1957 
 Mille Miglia, Turismo Preparato 750 cc, Italy
 1st Charlie Lohmander and Harald Kronegård
 GAMR - Great American Mountain Rallye, US
 1st Bob Wehman and Louis Braun, US
 1st Best marque team
 6th Rolf Mellde and Morrow Mushkin
 17th Jerry Jankowitz and Doris Jankowitz
 1000 Lakes Rally, Finland
 1st Erik Carlsson
 1st Best marque team Erik Carlsson, Carl Otto Bremer, Harald Kronegård
 1st Finnish champion, Carl Otto Bremer
 Rallye Adriatique, Yugoslavia
 1st R M Hopfen
 Lime Rock Rally, US
 1st Bob Wehman
 Rikspokalen, Sweden
 1st Carl-Magnus Skogh
 Finnish Snow Rallye, Finland
 2nd Erik Carlsson
 Acropolis Rally Greece
 2nd Henri Blanchoud
 Rallye Atlas-Oasis, Morocco
 2nd Harald Kronegård and Leonce Beysson

1959 
 24 Hours of Le Mans
 2nd in its class and 12th total

1960 
 Finnish Snow Rallye, Finland
 1st Carl Otto Bremer

2008 
 24 hours Le Mans Classic, compensated
 1st in its class and 2nd overall

2010 
 Le Mans Classic, compensated
 5th

References

External links 

 Saab 93 at Saabmuseum.com
 Saab 93 at 2008 Le Mans Classic

Front-wheel-drive vehicles
93
Compact cars
Coupés
Cars introduced in 1955
24 Hours of Le Mans race cars
Mille Miglia